Buraki (also Romanized as Būrakī and Bowrakī; also known as Chaman-e Būrakī and Kumābūraki) is a village in Ramjerd-e Do Rural District, Dorudzan District, Marvdasht County, Fars Province, Iran. At the 2006 census, its population was 907, in 213 families.

References 

Populated places in Marvdasht County